Babes and Brazzers is an adult pay-per-view channel that broadcasts pornographic content, and is part of the international division of the Spice Networks owned by MindGeek. The network originally launched as Paul Raymond TV in October 2008, and has gone through various names since.

History

The channel launched as Paul Raymond TV in October 2008, replacing the free-to-air Playboy One. The channel broadcast pornographic videos from the Paul Raymond website, paulraymond.com.

By mid-2009, the channel was renamed to Top Shelf TV, but its programming lineup remained the same. Around this time, the channel began to air unencrypted during the post-watershed hours of 5:30am and 10pm by broadcasting shows that aired on Elite TV. On 2 September 2009, Top Shelf TV was added to Virgin Media channel 478, replacing Spice Extreme.

On 4 March 2011, the channel was rebranded as My Ex-Girlfriends.

On 30 November 2017, as part of a re-shuffle of the adult channels on Sky UK, the channel was renamed again, becoming Babes and Brazzers, becoming a UK version of MindGeek's existing brands Babes TV and Brazzers TV. On 30 September 2020, following the sale of Portland TV's assets to MG Global Entertainment, the channel moved to 903 on the Sky EPG, with all the adult networks now part of one bundle on Sky.

See also
 List of adult television channels
 Pornography in the United Kingdom

References

MindGeek
Television pornography
British pornographic television channels
Television channels and stations established in 2008